International Cruise Terminal Station Mumbai, is an international cruise terminal with a capacity to handle 500 passengers at a time in the city of Mumbai, India.

References

https://www.freepressjournal.in/mumbai/mumbai-international-cruise-terminal-likely-to-open-by-jan-2023

Buildings and structures in Mumbai
Water transport in India
Tourism in Mumbai